Colonel Chabert is a 1943 French drama film directed by René Le Hénaff, starring Raimu, Marie Bell, Aimé Clariond and Jacques Baumer. It tells the story of a French officer who is assumed dead during the Napoleonic Wars, but returns ten years later to a very different France, both on a political and personal level. The film is based on the novel Colonel Chabert by Honoré de Balzac. James Travers has written, "This superlative adaptation of Balzac's great novel was one of a number of prestigious film productions made under the Occupation (1940–1944)."

A later film adaptation of the Balzac story, with Gerard Depardieu in the lead, was released in 1994.

Cast
 Raimu as Le colonel Chabert
 Marie Bell as La comtesse Ferraud
 Jacques Baumer as Delbecq
 Aimé Clariond as Maître Derville
 Fernand Fabre as Le comte Ferraud
 Suzanne Flon as Albertine
 Pierre Alcover as Le directeur de l'asile
 Roger Blin as Un clerc
 Jacques Charon as Un clerc
 Pierre Brulé as le fils Ferraud
 Arlette Wherly as la fille Ferraud

References

External links

Films set in 1817
1940s historical drama films
1943 films
Films based on French novels
Films based on works by Honoré de Balzac
French historical drama films
French black-and-white films
Napoleonic Wars films
1943 drama films
Films directed by René Le Hénaff
1940s French films